Casavatore is a comune (municipality) in the Metropolitan City of Naples of 18 683 citizens in the Italian region Campania, located about 8 km north of Naples. It is the first Italian comune by land consumed with 90.9% of urbanized land.

References

External links
Official website 

Cities and towns in Campania